was the Governor of Hiroshima Prefecture from 1981 to 1993.

In August 1990, while participating in a symposium in Hiroshima, publicly called on Soviet leader Mikhail Gorbachev to visit Hiroshima .

References

People from Hiroshima
People from Shimane Prefecture
Kyoto University alumni
Governors of Hiroshima
1924 births
2008 deaths